The Mato Kósyk House is a private residence in Albion, Oklahoma.  It was added to the National Register of Historic Places in 1979.

Mato Kósyk 

Mato Kósyk (1853–1940) was a well-known poet who is considered one of the chief writers of Sorbian, a Slavic language spoken in the Lusatia region of eastern Germany.  Kósyk emigrated from Lusatia to the United States during the 19th Century, eventually settling in rural Albion, due to its healthy and scenic location amidst the Kiamichi Mountains.  At the time of his death Kósyk's writings were actively suppressed by the Nazi government in Germany, which considered Sorbian nationalism a threat to its regime.

House 

Kosyk's home is located approximately one-third mile west of Albion.  It is a somewhat unprepossessing home, the chief architectural feature of which is a porch wrapped around two sides.  The home, built in approximately 1910, features a beautiful view of the Kiamichi Mountains.  The home is notable for being the sole surviving structure associated with Kosyk.

References

External links
Photograph of the house

Houses on the National Register of Historic Places in Oklahoma
Houses in Pushmataha County, Oklahoma
Sorbian American
Houses completed in 1910
National Register of Historic Places in Pushmataha County, Oklahoma